Alexander Graham Doggart, JP (2 June 1897 – 7 June 1963) was an English administrator, first-class cricketer, footballer and magistrate.

Doggart was born in Bishop Auckland, County Durham. He was educated at Darlington Grammar School and Bishop's Stortford College, an independent school in the historic market town of Bishop's Stortford in Hertfordshire, followed by King's College at the University of Cambridge. He saw active service in the Army during the First World War, before going to university.
 
He played cricket as a right-handed batsman and a right-arm medium fast bowler for Cambridge University (1919–1922) (where he was awarded a "Blue" in 1921 and 1922), Durham in 1924 and Middlesex in 1925.

He was a useful footballer as an inside-forward. He appeared in the Cambridge football XI in 1920 and 1921, gained a full international cap for England, captaining the team versus Belgium on 1 November 1923, and took part in four Amateur Internationals. He was a leading forward for the Corinthians, scoring the goal by which they defeated Blackburn Rovers in Round 1 of the FA Cup in January 1924. He also represented Bishop Auckland F.C. and the Casuals F.C.  He played for the "Amateurs" in the 1929 FA Charity Shield. He played twice for Darlington in the 1921–22 Football League.

He was a committee member of Sussex County Cricket Club and of the full M.C.C. Committee. He was also a successful football administrator and served as the Chairman of the F.A. from 1961 to 1963. He died suddenly while chairing the annual meeting of the Football Association at Lancaster Gate, Bayswater. He was 66.

His brother Jimmy Doggart became a distinguished ophthalmologist and his eldest son Hubert Doggart became a successful cricketer, administrator and schoolmaster.

References

External links
 Cricinfo
 Cricket Archive

Corinthian Casuals F.C. - Player profiles

1897 births
1963 deaths
Alumni of King's College, Cambridge
Cambridge University cricketers
Durham cricketers
English cricketers
Middlesex cricketers
Free Foresters cricketers
English footballers
Bishop Auckland F.C. players
Casuals F.C. players
Corinthian F.C. players
Darlington F.C. players
English Football League players
England international footballers
Sportspeople from Bishop Auckland
Cricketers from County Durham
Chairmen of the Football Association
Minor Counties cricketers
Gentlemen cricketers
People educated at Bishop's Stortford College
Association football inside forwards
H. D. G. Leveson Gower's XI cricketers
20th-century English businesspeople